Zadar (historically known as Zara (from Venetian and  Italian); see also other names), is the oldest continuously inhabited city in Croatia. It is situated on the Adriatic Sea, at the northwestern part of Ravni Kotari region. Zadar serves as the seat of Zadar County and of the wider northern Dalmatian region.

Today, Zadar is a historical center of Dalmatia, Zadar County's principal political, cultural, commercial, industrial, educational, and transportation centre. Zadar is also the episcopal see of the Archdiocese of Zadar. Because of its rich heritage, Zadar is today one of the most popular Croatian tourist destinations, named "entertainment center of the Adriatic" by The Times and "Croatia's new capital of cool" by The Guardian.

UNESCO's World Heritage Site list included the fortified city of Zadar as part of Venetian Works of Defence between 15th and 17th centuries: Stato da Terra – western Stato da Mar in 2017.

Etymology and historical names 
The name of the city of Zadar emerged as Iadera and Iader in ancient times. It was most probably related to a hydrographical term, coined by an ancient Mediterranean people and their Pre-Indo-European language. They transmitted it to later settlers, the Liburnians.

During Antiquity the name was often recorded in sources in Latin in two forms: Iader in the inscriptions and in the writings of classic writers, Iadera predominantly among the late Antiquity writers, while usual ethnonyms were Iadestines and Iadertines. The accent was on the first syllable in both Iader and Iadera forms, which influenced the early-Medieval Dalmatian forms Jadra, Jadera and Jadertina, where the accent kept its original place.

In Dalmatian, Jadra (Jadera) was pronounced Zadra (Zadera), due to the phonetic transformation of Ja- to Za-. That change was also reflected in the Croatian name Zadar (recorded as Zader in the 12th century), developed from masculine Zadъrъ. An ethnonym graphic Jaderani from the legend of Saint Chrysogonus in the 9th century, was identical to the initial old-Slavic form Zadъrane, or Renaissance Croatian Zadrani.

Jadera became Zara when it fell under the authority of the Republic of Venice in the 15th century. Zara was later used by the Austrian Empire in the 19th century, but it was provisionally changed to Zadar/Zara from 1910 to 1920; from 1920 to 1947 the city became part of Italy as Zara, and finally was named Zadar in 1947.

Geography

Zadar faces the islands of Ugljan and Pašman (part of the Zadar Archipelago), from which it is separated by the narrow Zadar Strait. The promontory on which the old city stands used to be separated from the mainland by a deep moat which has since been filled. The harbour, to the north-east of the town, is safe and spacious.

Climate
Zadar has a borderline humid subtropical (Cfa) and Mediterranean climate (Csa). Zadar has mild, wet winters and very warm, humid summers. Temperatures can consistently reach over  during the summer months, but during spring and autumn may also reach  almost every year. Temperatures below  are rare, and are not maintained for more than a few days. Through July and August temperature has never dropped below . Winter is the wettest season, however it can rain in Zadar at any time of the year. Snow is exceedingly rare, but it may fall in December, January, February and much more rarely in March. On average Zadar has 1.4 days of snow a year, but it is more likely that the snow does not fall. Sometimes in February the sea temperature can drop to only  and in July exceed .

History

Prehistory 
The district of present-day Zadar has been populated since prehistoric times. The earliest evidence of human life comes from the Late Stone Age, while numerous settlements have been dated as early as the Neolithic. Before the Illyrians, the area was inhabited by an ancient Mediterranean people of a pre-Indo-European culture. They assimilated with the Indo-Europeans who settled between the 4th and 2nd millennium BC into a new ethnical unity, that of the Liburnians. Zadar was a Liburnian settlement, laid out in the 9th century BC, built on a small stone islet and embankments where the old city stands and tied to the mainland by the overflown narrow isthmus, which created a natural port in its northern strait.

Antiquity 
The Liburnians, an Illyrian tribe, were known as great sailors and merchants, but also had a reputation for piracy in the later years. By the 7th century BC, Zadar had become an important centre for their trading activities with the Phoenicians, Etruscans, Ancient Greeks and other Mediterranean peoples. Its population at that time is estimated at 2,000. From the 9th to the 6th century there was certain cultural unity in the Adriatic Sea, with the general Liburninan seal, whose naval supremacy meant both political and economical authority through several centuries. Due to its geographical position, Zadar developed into a main seat of the Liburnian thalassocracy and took a leading role in the Liburnian tetradekapolis, an organization of 14 communes.

The people of Zadar, Iadasinoi, were first mentioned in 384 BC as the allies of the natives of Hvar and the leaders of an eastern Adriatic coast coalition in the fight against the Greek colonizers. An expedition of 10,000 men in 300 ships sailed out from Zadar and laid siege to the Greek colony Pharos in the island of Hvar, but the Syracusan fleet of Dionysus was alerted and attacked the siege fleet. The naval victory went to the Greeks which allowed them relatively safer further colonization in the southern Adriatic.

In the middle of the 2nd century BC, the Romans began to gradually invade the region. Although being first Roman enemies in the Adriatic Sea, the Liburnians, mostly stood aside in more than 230 years of Roman wars with the Illyrians, to protect their naval and trade connections in the sea. In 59 BC, Illyricum was assigned as a provincia (zone of responsibility) to Julius Caesar and Liburnian Iadera became a Roman municipium.

The Liburnian naval force was dragged into the Roman civil war between Julius Caesar and Pompey in 49 BC, partially by force, partially because of the local interests of the participants, the Liburnian cities. Caesar was supported by the urban Liburnian centres, like Iader (Zadar), Aenona (Nin) and Curicum (Krk), while the city of Issa (Vis) and the rest of the Liburnians gave their support to Pompey. In 49 BC near the island of Krk, the "Navy of Zadar", equipped by the fleets of a few Liburnian cities and supported by some Roman ships, lost an important naval battle against Pompey supporting the "Liburnian navy". The civil war was prolonged until the end of 48 BC, when Caesar rewarded his supporters in Liburnian Iader and Dalmatian Salona, by giving the status of the Roman colonies to their communities. Thus the city was granted the title colonia Iulia Iader, after its founder, and in the next period some of the Roman colonists (mostly legionary veterans) settled there.

The real establishment of the Roman province of Illyricum occurred not earlier than 33 BC and Octavian's military campaign in Illyria and Liburnia, when the Liburnians finally lost their naval independence and their galleys and sailors were incorporated into the Roman naval fleets.

From the early days of Roman rule, Zadar gained its Roman urban character and developed into one of the most flourishing centres on the eastern Adriatic coast, a state of affairs which lasted for several hundred years. It did not play a significant role in the Roman administration of Dalmatia, although the archaeological finds tell us about a significant growth of economy and culture.

Christianity did not bypass the Roman province of Dalmatia. Already by the end of the 3rd century Zadar had its own bishop and founding of its Christian community took place; a new religious centre was built north of the forum together with a basilica and a baptistery, as well as other ecclesiastical buildings. According to some estimates, in the 4th century it had probably around ten thousand citizens, including the population from its ager, the nearby islands and hinterland, an admixture of the indigenous Liburnians and Roman colonists.

Early Middle Ages 

During the Migration Period and the Barbarian invasions, Zadar was one of the remaining Dalmatian city-states, but it stagnated. In 441 and 447 Dalmatia was ravaged by the Huns, after the fall of the Western Roman Empire, in 481 Dalmatia became part of the Ostrogothic kingdom, which, besides Italy, already included the more northerly parts of Illyricum, i.e. Pannonia and Noricum.

In the 5th century, under the rule of the Ostrogothic Kingdom, Zadar became poor with many civic buildings ruined due to its advanced age. About the same time (6th century) it was hit by an earthquake, which destroyed entire complexes of monumental Roman architecture, whose parts would later serve as material for building houses. This caused a loss of population and created demographic changes in the city, then gradually repopulated by the inhabitants from its hinterland. However, during six decades of Gothic rule, the Goths saved those old Roman Municipal institutions that were still in function, while religious life in Dalmatia even intensified in the last years, so that there was a need for the foundation of additional bishoprics.

In 536, the Byzantine emperor Justinian the Great started a military campaign to reconquer the territories of the former Western Empire (see Gothic War); and in 553 Zadar passed to the Byzantine Empire. In 568, Dalmatia was devastated by an Avar invasion; although further waves of attacks by Avar and Slav tribes kept up the pressure, it was the only city which survived due to its protective belt of inland plains. The Dalmatian capital Salona was captured and destroyed in the 640s, so Zadar became the new seat of the Byzantine archonty of Dalmatia, territorially reduced to a few coastal cities with their agers and municipal lands at the coast and the islands nearby. The prior of Zadar had jurisdiction over all Byzantine Dalmatia, so Zadar enjoyed metropolitan status at the eastern Adriatic coast. At this time rebuilding began to take place in the city.

At the beginning of the 9th century the Zadar bishop Donatus and the city duke Paul mediated in the dispute between the Holy Roman empire under Pepin and the Byzantine Empire. The Franks held Zadar for a short time, but the city was returned to Byzantium by a decision of the 812 Treaty of Aachen.

Zadar's economy revolved around the sea, fishing and sea trade in the first centuries of the Middle Ages. Thanks to saved Antique ager, adjusted municipal structure and a new strategic position, it became the most important city between the Kvarner islands and Kaštela Bay. Byzantine Dalmatia was not territorially unified, but an alliance of city municipalities headed by Zadar, and the large degree of city autonomy allowed the development of Dalmatian cities as free communes. Forced to turn their attention seawards, the inhabitants of Zadar focused on shipping, and the city became a naval power to rival Venice. The citizens were Dalmatian speakers, but from the 7th century Croatian started to spread in the region, becoming predominant in the inland and the islands to the end of the 9th century.

The Mediterranean and Adriatic cities developed significantly during a period of peace from the last decades of the 9th to the middle of the 10th century. Especially favourable conditions for navigation in the Adriatic Sea occurred since the Saracen raids had finished. Also the adjustment of relations with the Croats enabled Zadar merchants to trade with its rich agriculture hinterland where the Kingdom of Croatia had formed, and trade and political links with Zadar began to develop. Croatian settlers began to arrive, becoming commonplace by the 10th century, occupying all city classes, as well as important posts, like those of prior, judge, priest and others.  In 925, Tomislav, the Duke of Croatian Dalmatia, united Croatian Dalmatia and Pannonia establishing the Croatian Kingdom.

Following the dynastic struggle between the descendants of king Stjepan Držislav after his death in 997, the city was besieged in 998 by the army of the Bulgarian emperor Samuel but managed to defend itself.

High Middle Ages 
At the time of Zadar's medieval development, the city became a threat to Venice's ambitions, because of its strategic position at the centre of the eastern Adriatic coast.

In 998, Zadar sought Venetian protection against the Neretvian pirates. The Venetians were quick to fully exploit this opportunity: in 998 a fleet commanded by Doge Pietro Orseolo II, after having defeated pirates, landed in Korčula and Lastovo. Dalmatia was taken by surprise and offered little serious resistance. Trogir was the exception and was subjected to Venetian rule only after a bloody struggle, whereas Dubrovnik was forced to pay tribute. Tribute previously paid by Zadar to Croatian kings, was redirected to Venice, a state of affairs which lasted for several years.

Zadar citizens started to work for the full independence of Zadar and from the 1030s the city was formally a vassal of the Byzantine Empire. The head of this movement was the mightiest Zadar patrician family – the Madi. After negotiations with Byzantium, Zadar was attached to the Croatian state led by king Petar Krešimir IV in 1069. Later, after the death of king Dmitar Zvonimir in 1089 and ensuing dynastic run-ins, in 1105 Zadar accepted the rule of the first Croato-Hungarian king, Coloman, King of Hungary.

In the meantime Venice developed into a true trading force in the Adriatic and started attacks on Zadar. The city was repeatedly invaded by Venice between 1111 and 1154 and then once more between 1160 and 1183, when it finally rebelled, appealing to the Pope and to the Croato-Hungarian throne for protection.

Zadar was especially devastated in 1202 after the Venetian Doge Enrico Dandolo used the crusaders, on their Fourth Crusade to Palestine, to lay siege to the city. The crusaders were obliged to pay Venice for sea transport to Egypt. As they were not able to produce enough money, the Venetians used them to initiate the Siege of Zadar, when the city was ransacked, demolished and robbed. Emeric, king of Croatia and Hungary, condemned the crusade, because of an argument about the possible heresy committed by God's army in attacking a Christian city. Nonetheless, Zadar was devastated and captured, with the population escaping into the surrounding countryside. Pope Innocent III excommunicated the Venetians and crusaders involved in the siege.

Two years later (1204), under the leadership of the Croatian nobleman Domald from Šibenik, most of the refugees returned and liberated the city from what remained of the crusader force. In 1204 Domald was comes (duke) of Zadar, but the following year (1205) Venetian authority was re-established and a peace agreement signed with hard conditions for the citizens. The only profit which the Communal Council of Zadar derived from this was one third of the city's harbour taxes, probably insufficient even for the most indispensable communal needs.

This did not break the spirit of the city, however. Its commerce was suffering due to a lack of autonomy under Venice, while it enjoyed considerable autonomy under the much more feudal Kingdom of Croatia-Hungary. A number of insurrections followed (1242–1243, 1320s, 1345–1346 – the latter resulted in a sixteen-month-long Venetian siege) which finally resulted in Zadar coming back under the crown of King Louis I of Croatia-Hungary under the Treaty of Zadar, in 1358. After the War of Chioggia between Genoa and Venice, Chioggia concluded on 14 March 1381 an alliance with Zadar and Trogir against Venice, and finally Chioggia became better protected by Venice in 1412, because Šibenik became in 1412 the seat of the main customs office and the seat of the salt consumers office with a monopoly on the salt trade in Chioggia and on the whole Adriatic Sea. After the death of Louis, Zadar recognized the rule of king Sigismund, and after him, that of Ladislaus of Naples. During his reign Croatia-Hungary was enveloped in a bloody civil war. In 1409, Venice, seeing that Ladislaus was about to be defeated, and eager to exploit the situation despite its relative military weakness, offered to buy his "rights" on Dalmatia for a mere 100,000 ducats. Knowing he had lost the region in any case, Ladislaus accepted. Zadar was, thus sold back to the Venetians for a paltry sum.

The population of Zadar during the Medieval period was predominantly Croatian, according to numerous archival documents, and Croatian was used in liturgy, as shown by the writings of cardinal Boson, who followed Pope Alexander III en route to Venice in 1177. When the papal ships took shelter in the harbour of Zadar, the inhabitants greeted the Pope by singing lauds and canticles in Croatian.
Even though interspersed by sieges and destruction, the time between the 11th and 14th centuries was the golden age of Zadar. Thanks to its political and trading achievements, and also to its skilled seamen, Zadar played an important role among the cities on the east coast of the Adriatic. This affected its appearance and culture: many churches, rich monasteries and palaces for powerful families were built, together with the Chest of Saint Simeon. One of the best examples of the culture and prosperity of Zadar at that time was the founding of the University of Zadar, built in 1396 by the Dominican Order (the oldest university in present-day Croatia).

15th to 18th centuries 

After the death of Louis I, Zadar came under the rule of Sigmund of Luxembourg and later Ladislaus of Naples, who, witnessing his loss of influence in Dalmatia, sold Zadar and his dynasty's rights to Dalmatia to Venice for 100,000 ducats on 31 July 1409. Venice therefore obtained control over Zadar without a fight, but was confronted by the resistance and tensions of important Zadar families. These attempts were met with persecution and confiscation. Zadar remained the administrative seat of Dalmatia, but this time under the rule of Venice, which expanded over the whole Dalmatia, except the Republic of Ragusa/Dubrovnik. During that time Giorgio da Sebenico, a renaissance sculptor and architect, famous for his work on the Cathedral of Šibenik, was born in Zadar. Other important people followed, such as Luciano and Francesco Laurana, known worldwide for their sculptures and buildings.

The 16th and 17th centuries were noted in Zadar for Ottoman attacks. Ottomans captured the continental part of Zadar at the beginning of the 16th century and the city itself was all the time in the range of Turkish artillery. Due to that threat, the construction of a new system of castles and walls began. These defense systems changed the way the city looked. To make place for the pentagon castles many houses and churches were taken down, along with an entire suburb: Varoš of St. Martin. After the 40-year-long construction Zadar became the biggest fortified city in Dalmatia, empowered by a system of castles, bastions and canals filled with seawater. The city was supplied by the water from public city cisterns. During the complete makeover of Zadar, many new civic buildings were built, such as the City Lodge and City Guard on the Gospodski Square, several army barracks, but also some large new palaces.

In contrast to the insecurity and Ottoman sieges and destruction, an important culture evolved midst the city walls. During the 16th and the 17th centuries Zadar was still under the influence of the Renaissance, which had created an environment in which arts and literature could flourish, despite the ongoing conflicts outside the city walls. This period saw the rise of many important Italian Renaissance figures, such as the painters Giorgio Ventura and Andrea Meldolla, and the humanist scholar Giovanni Francesco Fortunio, who wrote the first Italian grammar book. Meanwhile, the activity of the Croatian writers and poets became prolific (Jerolim Vidolić, Petar Zoranić, Brne Karnarutić, Juraj Baraković, Šime Budinić).

During the continuous Ottoman danger the population stagnated by a significant degree along with the economy. During the 16th and 17th centuries several large-scale epidemics of bubonic plague erupted in the city. After more than 150 years of Turkish threat Zadar was not only scarce in population, but also in material wealth. Venice sent new colonists and, under the firm hand of archbishop Vicko Zmajević, the Arbanasi (Catholic Albanian refugees) settled in the city, forming a new suburb. Despite the shortage of money, the Teatro Nobile (Theater for Nobility) was built in 1783. It functioned for over 100 years.

19th and 20th centuries 

In 1797 with the Treaty of Campo Formio, the Republic of Venice, including Zadar, came under the Austrian crown. In 1806 it was briefly given to the Napoleonic Kingdom of Italy, until in 1809 it was added to the French Illyrian Provinces. In November 1813 an Austrian force blockaded the town with the assistance of two British Royal Navy frigates HMS Havannah and Weazle under the 3rd Earl of Cadogan. On 9 December the French garrison of Zadar capitulated, and by the end of the year all of Dalmatia was brought back under the control of the Austrian Empire. After the Congress of Vienna (1815) until 1918, the town (bilingual name Zara – Zadar ) remained part of the Austrian monarchy (Austria side after the compromise of 1867), head of the district of the same name, one of the 13 Bezirkshauptmannschaften in Dalmatia. The Italian name was officially used before 1867. It remained also the capital of Dalmatia province (Kronland).

Although during the first half of the 19th century the city population stagnated due to low natural increase, the city started to spread from the old center; citizens from the old city created the new suburb of Stanovi in the north.

During the second half of the 19th century, there was constant increase of population due to economic growth and immigration. Under the pressure of the population increase, the city continued to spread to Voštarnica and Arbanasi quarters, and the bridge in the city port was built. Except being the administrative center of the province, agriculture, industry of liqueurs and trade were developed, many brotherhoods were established, similar to the Central European trade guilds. The southern city walls were torn down, new coastal facilities were built and Zadar became an open port. As the city developed economically, it developed culturally. A large number of printshops, new libraries, archives, and theatres sprung up. At the end of the 19th century there was also stronger industrial development, with 27 small or big factories before the World War I.

After 1848, Italian and Croatian nationalistic ideas arrived in the city, which became divided between the Croats and the Italians, both of whom founded their respective political parties.

There are conflicting sources for both sides claiming to have formed the majority in Zadar in this period. The archives of the official Austro-Hungarian censuses conducted around the end of 19th century show that Italian was the primary language spoken by the majority of the people in the city (9,018 Italians and 2,551 Croatians in 1900), but only by a third of the population in the entire county (9,234 vs. 21,753 the same year).

During the 19th century, the conflict between Zadar's Italian and Croatian communities grew in intensity and changed its nature. Until the beginning of the century it had been of moderate intensity and mainly of a class nature (under Venetian rule the Italians were employed in the most profitable activities, such as trade and administration). With the development of the modern concept of national identity across Europe, national conflicts started to mark the political life of Zadar.

During the second part of the 19th century, Zadar was subject to the same policy enacted by the Austrian Empire in South-Tyrol, the Austrian Littoral and Dalmatia and consisting in fostering the local German or Croatian culture at the expense of the Italian. In Zadar and generally throughout Dalmatia, the Austrian policy had the objective to reduce the possibility of any future territorial claim by the Kingdom of Italy.

Italy (1918–1947) 
In 1915, Italy entered World War I under the provisions set in the Treaty of London. In exchange for its participation with the Triple Entente and in the event of victory, Italy was to obtain the following territory in northern Dalmatia, including Zadar, Šibenik and most of the Dalmatian islands, except Krk and Rab. At the end of the war, Italian military forces invaded Dalmatia and seized control of Zara, with Admiral Enrico Millo being proclaimed the governor of Dalmatia. Famous Italian nationalist Gabriele d'Annunzio supported the seizure of Dalmatia, and proceeded to Zadar in an Italian warship in December 1918.

During 1918, political life in Zadar intensified. The collapse of the Austro-Hungarian monarchy led to the renewal of national conflicts in the city. With the arrival of an Italian army of occupation in the city on 4 November 1918, the Italian faction gradually assumed control, a process which was completed on 5 December when it took over the governorship. With the Treaty of Versailles (10 January 1920) Italian claims on Dalmatia contained in the Treaty of London were nullified, but later on the agreements between the Kingdom of Italy and the Kingdom of Serbs, Croats and Slovenes set in the Treaty of Rapallo (12 November 1920) gave Zadar with other small local territories to Italy.

The territory was organized into a small Italian province, the province of Zara. According to the 1921 census, in the comune of Zara there were 12,075 Dalmatian Italians and 1,255 Croatians.

World War II 

Germany, Italy, and other Axis Powers, invaded the Kingdom of Yugoslavia on 6 April 1941. Zadar held a force of 9,000 and was one of the starting points of the invasion. The force reached Šibenik and Split on 15 April (2 days before surrender). Civilians were previously evacuated to Ancona . Occupying Mostar and Dubrovnik, on 17 April they met invading troops that had started out from Italian-occupied Albania. On 17 April the Yugoslav government surrendered, faced with the Wehrmacht's overwhelming superiority.

Mussolini required the newly formed Nazi puppet-state, the so-called Independent State of Croatia (NDH) to hand over almost all of Dalmatia (including Split) to Italy under the Rome Treaties.

The city became the center of a new Italian territorial entity, the Governorate of Dalmatia, including the enlarged province of Zara (now Zadar), the province of Cattaro (now Kotor), and the province of Spalato (Split).

Under Italian rule, the Croats were subjected to a policy of forced assimilation. This created immense resentment among the Yugoslav people. The Yugoslav Partisan movement took root in Zadar, even though more than 70% of population of Zadar was Italian.

After Mussolini was removed from power on 25 July 1943, Italy signed an armistice with the Allies, which was announced on 8 September 1943, and the Italian army collapsed. Then on 12 September 1943, Mussolini was rescued by the Germans, and formed the Nazi-puppet Italian Social Republic. German troops (114th Jäger Division) entered Zadar on 10 September and took over. This avoided a temporary liberation by Partisans, as was the case in Split and Šibenik. Zadar was placed under the control of the Italian Social Republic.

The NDH proclaimed the Treaty of Rome to be void and occupied Dalmatia with German support. But the NDH was prevented from taking over Zadar on the grounds that Zadar itself was not subject to the conditions of the 1941 Treaty of Rome. Despite this, NDH leader Ante Pavelić designated Zadar as the capital of the Sidraga-Ravni Kotari County, although the county administrator could not enter the city.

During World War II, Zadar was bombed by the Allies, from November 1943 to October 1944. Estimated fatalities range from under 1,000, up to as many as 4,000 of the city's 20,000 inhabitants. Over the course of the bombing, 80% of the city's buildings were destroyed. Zadar has been called the "Dresden of the Adriatic" because of perceived similarities to the Allied bombing of Dresden.

In late October 1944, the German army and most of the Italian civilian administration abandoned the city, except the Vice Prefect Giacomo Vuxani. On 31 October 1944, the Partisans seized the city, until then a part of Mussolini's Italian Social Republic. At the start of World War II, Zadar had a population of 24,000; by the end of 1944, this had decreased to 6,000. Though controlled by the Partisans, Zadar remained under nominal Italian sovereignty until the Paris Peace Treaties that took effect on 15 September 1947. After the war Dalmatian Italians of Zadar left Yugoslavia towards Italy (Istrian–Dalmatian exodus).

SFR Yugoslavia (1947–1991) 
In 1947, Zadar became part of the Socialist Federal Republic of Yugoslavia and the Socialist Republic of Croatia. In the first decade after the war, the city's population increase was slow and still did not reach its pre-war numbers. The Italian exodus from the city continued and in a few years was almost total. It is estimated that around 10,000 Italians emigrated from Zadar. In October 1953, the last Italian schools in the area were closed. Today the Italian community counts only a few hundred people, gathered into a local community (Comunità degli Italiani di Zara).

The city recorded a large population increase in the late 1950s and the 1960s, mainly due to immigration as the government encouraged migration from rural areas to urban centers and their industrial development. Construction of the Adriatic Highway, railway and civil airport contributed to the development of tourism and the accessibility of Zadar. Population growth slowed down in the following decades. In the late 1980s, due to the economic crisis in Yugoslavia, Zadar's economy began stagnating.

Croatian War of Independence (1991–1995) 
In 1990, Serb separatists from Dalmatian Hinterland sealed roads and effectively blocked Dalmatia from the rest of Croatia during the Log Revolution. In March 1991, the Croatian War of Independence broke out that affected Zadar and its surroundings. A number of non-Serbs were expelled from the area and several Croatian policemen were killed resulting in the 1991 anti-Serb riot in Zadar. Serbs at that time accounted for about 14% of the population.

The Yugoslav People's Army (JNA) and forces of the SAO Krajina occupied parts of Zadar's hinterland, converged on the city and subjected it to artillery bombardment during the Battle of Zadar. Along with other Croatian towns in the area, Serb forces shelled Zadar sporadically, damaging buildings and homes as well as UNESCO protected sites. Serb forces also attacked a number of nearby towns and villages, the most brutal attack being the Škabrnja massacre in which Krajina Territorial Defense troops killed 62 Croatian civilians and five prisoners of war.

Land connections with Zagreb were severed for over a year. The only link between the north and south of the country was via the island of Pag. The siege of the city lasted from 1991 until January 1993 when Zadar and the surrounding area came under the control of Croatian forces and the bridge link with the rest of Croatia was reestablished in Operation Maslenica. Attacks on the city continued until the end of the war in 1995.

Some of the countryside along the No. 8 highway running north east is still sectioned off due to land mines.

Main sights

Architecture 
Zadar gained its urban structure in Roman times; during the time of Julius Caesar and Emperor Augustus, the town was fortified and the city walls with towers and gates were built. On the western side of the town were the forum, the basilica and the temple, while outside the town were the amphitheatre and cemeteries. The aqueduct which supplied the town with water is partially preserved. Inside the ancient town, a medieval town had developed with a series of churches and monasteries being built.

During the Middle Ages, Zadar fully gained its urban aspect, which has been maintained until today. In the first half of the 16th century, Venice fortified the town with a new system of defensive walls on the side facing land. In the course of the century architectural building in the Renaissance style was continued and defensive trenches (Foša) were also built. They were completely buried during the Italian occupation until that in 1873, under Austrian rule, the ramparts of Zadar were converted from fortifications into elevated promenades commanding extensive seaward and landward views, thus being the wall lines preserved; of its four old gates one, the Porta Marina, incorporates the relics of a Roman arch, and another, the Porta di Terraferma, was designed in the 16th century by the Veronese artist Michele Sanmicheli. In the bombardments during the Second World War entire blocks were destroyed, but some structures survived.

Most important landmarks include:
 Roman Forum – the largest on the eastern side of the Adriatic, founded by the first Roman Emperor Augustus, as shown by two stone inscriptions about its completion dating from the 3rd century.
 Most Roman remains were used in the construction of the fortifications, but two squares are embellished with lofty marble columns; a Roman tower stands on the eastern side of the town; and some remains of a Roman aqueduct may be seen outside the ramparts.
 Church of St. Donatus – a monumental round building from the 9th century in pre-Romanesque style, traditionally but erroneously said to have been erected on the site of a temple of Juno. It is the most important preserved structure of its period in Dalmatia; the massive dome of the rotunda is surrounded by a vaulted gallery in two stories which also extends around the three apses to the east. The church treasury contains some of the finest Dalmatian metalwork; notably the pastoral staff of Bishop Valaresso (1460).
 St. Anastasia's Cathedral (Croatian: Sv. Stošija), basilica in Romanesque style built in the 12th to 13th century (high Romanesque style), the largest cathedral in Dalmatia.
 The churches of St. Chrysogonus and St. Simeon are also architectural examples in the Romanesque style. The latter houses the ark or reliquary of St. Simeon (1380), made in gilted silver by Francesco Antonio da Milano under commission of queen Elizabeth of Hungary.
 St Chrysogonus's Church – monumental Romanesque church of very fine proportions and refined Romanesque ornaments.
 St Elijah's Church (Croatian: Sv. Ilija)
 St Francis' Church, Gothic styled church, site of the signing of the Zadar Peace Treaty 1358. Its choir is home to several carved stalls, executed in 1394 by the Venetian Giovanni di Giacomo da Borgo San Sepolcro.
 Five Wells Square
 St Mary's Church, which retains a fine Romanesque campanile from 1105, belongs to a Benedictine Convent founded in 1066 by a noblewoman of Zadar by the name of Cika with the permanent Ecclesiastical art exhibition "The Gold and Silver of Zadar".
 The Citadel. Built in 1409 southwest of the Land Gate, it has remained the same to this day.
 The Land Gate – built to a design by the Venetian architect Michele Sanmicheli in 1543
 The unique sea organ
 The Great Arsenal 
 Among the other chief buildings are the Loggia del Comune, rebuilt in 1565, and containing a public library; the old palace of the priors, now the governor's residence; and the episcopal palaces.

Culture 

The first university of Zadar was mentioned in writing as early as in 1396 and it was a part of a Dominican monastery. It closed in 1807.

Between the 15th and 17th centuries Zadar was an important Renaissance center, producing an array of Italian Dalmatia architects, sculptors, painters and scholars such as Giorgio da Sebenico, Laurana and Francesco Laurana, Giorgio Ventura, Andrea Meldolla and Giovanni Francesco Fortunio (who wrote the first Italian grammar book).

Zadar was, along with Split and Dubrovnik, also one of the centres of the development of Croatian literature. The 15th and 16th centuries were marked by important activities of Croatians writing in the national language: Jerolim Vidolić, Petar Zoranić (who wrote the first Croatian novel, Planine), Brne Karnarutić, Juraj Baraković, Šime Budinić.

Under French rule (1806–1810), the first Dalmatian newspaper Il Regio Dalmata – Kraglski Dalmatin was published in Zadar. It was printed in Italian and Croatian; this last used for the first time in a newspaper.

In the second half of the 19th century, Zadar was a centre of the movement for the cultural and national revivals in Dalmatia (Italian and Croatian).

Today Zadar's cultural institutions include:
 The Croatian Theatre House
 The National Museum
 The Archaeological Museum (established in 1830)
 The Museum of Ancient Glass
 The University of Zadar (founded in 1396, active until 1807 and refounded in 2002)
 The Maritime Museum
 Permanent Exhibition of Sacral Art
 Croatian Singing Musical Society Zoranić (established 1885)
 Musical Evenings in St. Donatus (established 1961)
 International Choirs Competition (established 1997)
 Arsenal Zadar

Notable people

 Tullio Carminati (1894–1971), actor
 Arturo Colautti (1851–1914), journalist
 Gianni Garko (born 1935), actor
 Pope John IV (died 642), pope
 Tomislav Karamarko (born 1959), politician
 Brne Karnarutić (1515–1573), poet
 Francesco Laurana (c. 1430–1502), sculptor
 Dominik Livaković (born 1995), footballer
 Luka Modrić (born 1985), footballer
 Dado Pršo (born 1974), footballer
 Giorgio da Sebenico (c. 1410–1473), sculptor
 Savo Štrbac (born 1949), lawyer and author
 Danijel Subašić (born 1984), footballer
 Enrico Tivaroni (1841–1925), magistrate
 Giorgio Ventura (16th-17th centuries), painter

City government

The administrative area of the City of Zadar includes the nearby villages of Babindub, Crno, Kožino and Petrčane, as well as the islands of Ist, Iž, Molat, Olib, Premuda, Rava and Silba. The total city area, including the islands, covers 194 km2.

Zadar is divided into 21 local districts: Arbanasi, Bili Brig, Bokanjac, Brodarica, Crvene Kuće, Diklo, Dračevac, Jazine I, Jazine II, Maslina, Novi Bokanjac, Poluotok, Ploča, Puntamika, Ričina, Sinjoretovo, Smiljevac, Stanovi, Vidikovac, Višnjik, Voštarnica.

The current mayor of Zadar is Branko Dukić (HDZ). He was elected for a second term on local elections held on 21 May 2021. The City Council is composed of 27 representatives.

Mayoral election

The City Council is composed of 27 representatives from the following political parties:

Population 

Zadar is the fifth largest city in Croatia and the second largest in Dalmatia, with a population of 75,082 according to the 2011 census. The 2001 census showed Zadar with a population of 72,718, with 93% of its citizens being ethnic Croats.

Economy 
Major industries include tourism, traffic, seaborne trade, agriculture, fishing and fish farming activities; metal manufacturing and mechanical engineering industries; chemicals and non-metal industry; and banking. Some of the largest companies with headquarters in Zadar are:

 Tankerska plovidba (maritime transport)
 Cromaris (food industry)
 Bakmaz (retail)
 Sonik (retail)
 Turisthotel (tourism)
 Maraska (food industry)
 Punta Sakla (tourism)
 Intermod (furniture retail and tourism)
 Adria, Mardešić (fish production)
 Vodovod (water supply)
 OTP Bank Hrvatska (finance industry)
 SAS (machine tools)
 Aluflexpack (production of flexible packaging)
 Arsenal Holdings (tourism)
 Liburnija (transportation)

The farmland just northeast of Zadar, Ravni Kotari, is a well known source of marasca cherries. Distilleries in Zadar have produced Maraschino since the 16th century.

Education

There are nine primary schools and 16 secondary schools, including six gymnasiums, in Zadar.

University

University of Zadar was founded by the Dominicans in 1396 as Universitas Iadertina, a theological seminary. It was the first institute of higher learning in the country. In 1807 it ceased to become an independent institution and its functions were taken over by other local universities. In 1956 the University of Zagreb, the country's second oldest university, re-established it as its satellite Faculty of Arts campus. The Faculty later became a part of the University of Split, and in 2003, a full-fledged independent university. University comprises 25 departments with more than 6.000 students.

Science
In 1998, Zadar hosted the Central European Olympiad in Informatics (CEOI).

Transportation 
In the 20th century, roads became more important than sea routes, but Zadar remained an important traffic point. The main road along the Adriatic passes through the city. In the immediate vicinity, there is the Zagreb–Dubrovnik highway, finished up to Split in 2005. Zadrans can access to the highway by two interchanges: Zadar 1 exit in the north and Zadar 2 highway hub near Zemunik in the south. The southern interchange is connected to Zadar port of Gaženica by the D424 expressway.

Today, buses are the only kind of ground public transportation with which one can reach Zadar. Zadar's bus station is used by both inter-city buses (which provide Zadar's connection with the rest of the country) and buses operated by the company "Liburnija" which provide public transit to the city of Zadar and its suburbs.

Since 1966, during the time of Yugoslavia,  railway has linked Zadar with Knin, where it joins the mainline from Zagreb to Split.  However, all passenger trains between Knin and Zadar were since 2013 replaced with the buses that ran in organisation of the national railway company Croatian Railways. As the company discounted bus-replacement service in 2020, Zadar has officially become the city without passenger railway connections.

Zadar also has an international ferry line to Ancona in Italy. Ships also connect Zadar with islands of its archipelago from two ferry ports: one located in the town center serving catamaran services and the other one located in the south suburb of Gaženica serving ferry and distant services.

The airport is experiencing year on year an average of 30% increase in passenger traffic mainly due to arrivals of lowcost carriers (Ryanair, InterSky, JobAir, etc.) connecting Zadar from the end of March through October with over 20 cities throughout Europe.

Sports 

The basketball club is KK Zadar, the football club NK Zadar, and the local handball club RK Zadar. The bowling club Kuglački klub Zadar is also very successful. Zadar is also the hometown of Croatian handball player Ivan Ninčević and football players Luka Modrić, Dado Pršo, Šime Vrsaljko and Danijel Subašić.

Other Sports:
Badminton: Badminton club Zadar

International relations 

Zadar is twinned, or maintains cultural, economic and educational ties with:
 Dundee, Scotland, United Kingdom
 Reggio Emilia, Italy
 Romans-sur-Isère, France
 Fürstenfeldbruck, Germany
 Székesfehérvár, Hungary
 Padua, Italy
 Iquique, Chile
 Banská Bystrica, Slovakia
 Milwaukee, United States

See also

 Archdiocese of Zadar
 Stato da Màr
 Bombing of Zadar in World War II
 Siege of Zadar (1345–46)
 History of Croatia
 History of Dalmatia
 Krešimir Ćosić Hall
 Liburnia
 Ottavio Missoni
 The church and monastery of St. Michael in Zadar - Croatia
 List of people from Zadar County

References

Sources

External links

 Zadar Tourist Board
 ZD portal
 City of Zadar official web page 

 
Articles containing video clips
Cities and towns in Croatia
Illyrian Croatia
Kingdom of Dalmatia
Mediterranean port cities and towns in Croatia
Populated coastal places in Croatia
Populated places established in the 9th century BC
Populated places in Zadar County
Ports and harbours of Croatia
Cities in ancient Illyria
Roman towns and cities in Croatia
Territories of the Republic of Venice
Former exclaves